Road Trips Full Show: Spectrum 11/6/79 is a spin-off of the Road Trips series which continues the tradition of releasing full shows of the band the Grateful Dead in download formats (both MP3 and FLAC) started with the Download Series.  It was released by Grateful Dead Productions in 2008, several months after the release of Road Trips Volume 1 Number 1, and is a full show from the same tour as that release.  It is a two disc release of a complete show the band performed on November 6, 1979 at the Spectrum in Philadelphia, Pennsylvania. This release was accompanied by the concurrent release of the show from the previous evening as Road Trips Full Show: Spectrum 11/5/79.

Track listing
Disc one
First set:
 "Alabama Getaway"  > (Garcia, Hunter)
 "Promised Land" (Chuck Berry)
 "Tennessee Jed" (Garcia, Hunter)
 "Me & My Uncle" >  (John Phillips)
 "Mexicali Blues" (Weir, Barlow)
 "Candyman" (Garcia, Hunter)
 "Easy To Love You" (Mydland, Barlow)
 "Looks Like Rain" (Weir, Barlow)
 "Jack-A-Roe" (Traditional)
 "Jack Straw" > (Weir, Hunter)
 "Deal" (Garcia, Hunter)
Disc two
Second set:
 "Terrapin Station" > (Garcia, Hunter)
 "Playing In The Band" > (Weir, Hart, Hunter)
 "Drums" > (Grateful Dead)
 "Space" > (Grateful Dead)
 "Black Peter" > (Garcia, Hunter)
 "Good Lovin' " (Clarke, Resnick)
Encore:
"U.S. Blues" (Garcia, Hunter)

Personnel
Jerry Garcia: lead guitar, vocals
Mickey Hart: drums
Bill Kreutzmann: drums
Phil Lesh: electric bass
Brent Mydland: keyboards, vocals
Bob Weir: rhythm guitar, vocals

References

Grateful Dead Download Series
Road Trips albums
2008 live albums